Municipal elections took place throughout Quebec, Canada, on November 1, 2009, to replace mayors and councillors.

Acton Vale

Alma

Amos

Amqui

Asbestos

Aumond

Baie-Comeau

Baie-Saint-Paul

Beaconsfield

Beauceville

Beauharnois

Bécancour

Beloeil

Blainville

Boileau

Boisbriand

Following media reports, the Directeur général des élections du Québec announced an investigation as to whether construction entrepreneur Lino Zambito attempted to persuade two opposition councillors to allow the incumbent mayor Sylvie Saint-Jean to be reelected unopposed.

Boischatel

Bois-des-Filion

Boucherville

Bowman

Bromont

Brossard

Brownsburg-Chatham

Bryson

Campbell's Bay

Candiac

Cantley

Carignan

Chambly

Chandler

Charlemagne

Châteauguay

Chelsea

Chertsey

Chibougamau

Coaticook

Contrecoeur

Cookshire-Eaton

Coteau-du-Lac

Côte Saint-Luc

Cowansville

Delson

Deux-Montagnes

Dolbeau-Mistassini

Dollard-des-Ormeaux

It was reported that outgoing mayor Ed Janiszewski had attempted to persuade his opponent Shameem Siddiqui not to run, citing the cost of holding an election. Siddiqui reacted indignantly, saying that Janiszewski was not "the king of Dollard" and that he has the right to run for office.

Donnacona

Dorval

Drummondville

Farnham

Fassett

Fort Coulonge

Gaspé

Gatineau
See 2009 Gatineau municipal election
At 8:59 PM, CBC reported that Marc Bureau, the incumbent mayor of Gatineau had won the Gatineau mayoral race.

Gracefield

Granby

Hampstead

Hudson

Joliette

Kazabazua

Kirkland

Lac-Beauport

Lac-Brome

Lachute

Lac-Mégantic

La Malbaie

L'Ancienne-Lorette

La Pêche

La Prairie

La Sarre

L'Assomption

La Tuque

Laval

At 9:12 PM, CBC reported that "Gilles Vaillancourt has been reelected for a sixth time as Laval mayor."

Lavaltrie

Les Cèdres

Les Îles-de-la-Madeleine

Lévis

L'Île-Perrot

Longueuil
See 2009 Longueuil municipal election

At 10:43 PM, TVA reported that Caroline St-Hilaire had been elected Mayor of Longueuil. As of 12:40 AM, the results are:

Lorraine

Louiseville

Low

Magog

Maniwaki

Marieville

Mascouche

Matane

Mayo

McMasterville

Mercier

Mirabel

Montebello

Mont-Joli

Mont-Laurier

Montmagny

Montpellier

Montreal
See 2009 Montreal municipal election

At 10:44 PM, TVA reported that Gérald Tremblay had been re-elected as mayor of Montreal.

Montréal-Ouest

Mont-Royal

Mont-Saint-Hilaire

Mont-Tremblant

Nicolet

Notre-Dame-de-l'Île-Perrot

Notre-Dame-des-Prairies

Notre-Dame-du-Mont-Carmel

Otterburn Park

Papineauville

Pincourt

Plaisance

Plessisville

Pointe-Calumet

Pointe-Claire

Pontiac

Pont-Rouge

Port-Cartier

Prévost

Princeville

Quebec City

At 8:21 PM, CBC Montreal reported that incumbent mayor Régis Labeaume had won the election with 82% of the vote.

Council Election, Maizerets-Lairet Ward:

Rawdon

Repentigny

Richelieu

Rigaud

Rimouski

Ripon

Rivière-du-Loup

Roberval

Rosemère

Rouyn-Noranda

Saguenay

At 9:08 PM, CBC reported that Jean Tremblay had won the mayoral race in Saguenay.

Saint-Amable

Saint-Augustin-de-Desmaures

Saint-Basile-le-Grand

Saint-Bruno-de-Montarville

Saint-Calixte

Saint-Césaire

Saint-Charles-Borromée

Saint-Colomban

Saint-Constant

Saint-Sixte

Sainte-Adèle

Sainte-Agathe-des-Monts

Sainte-Anne-de-Bellevue

Sainte-Anne-des-Monts

Sainte-Anne-des-Plaines

Sainte-Catherine

Sainte-Catherine-de-la-Jacques-Cartier

Sainte-Julie

Sainte-Julienne

Sainte-Marie

Sainte-Marthe-sur-le-Lac

Sainte-Sophie

Sainte-Thérèse

Saint-André-Avellin

Saint-Eustache

Saint-Félicien

Saint-Félix-de-Valois

Saint-Georges

Saint-Hippolyte

Saint-Hyacinthe

Saint-Jean-sur-Richelieu

Saint-Jérôme

Saint-Lambert

Saint-Lambert-de-Lauzon

Saint-Lazare

Saint-Lin-Laurentides

Saint-Philippe

Saint-Pie

Saint-Raymond

Saint-Rémi

Saint-Robert

Saint-Sauveur

Saint-Zotique

Salaberry-de-Valleyfield

Sept-Îles

Shawinigan

Shawville

Shefford

Sherbrooke

Sorel-Tracy

Réjean Dauplaise was sixty-four years old during the 2009 election, with sixteen years of experience as a councillor in Sorel (prior to its amalgamation with Tracy). He sought election to the amalgamated city's council in 2005 but was defeated. He ran a low-cost campaign with few assistants in 2009 and remarked after the election that he was surprised by his margin of victory.
Marcel Robert is a businessman in Sorel-Tracy who operated several establishments before his election as the amalgamated city's first mayor in 2000. He promoted environmental issues during his time in office, and in 2005 he accused the city of Montreal of contaminating his community with improperly cleaned water. A year after his defeat, he co-founded a franchise called Frais et Frisket.

Stoneham-et-Tewkesbury

Terrebonne

Thetford Mines

Thurso

Trois-Rivières

Val-des-Monts

Val-des-Bois

Val-d'Or

Varennes

Vaudreuil-Dorion

Verchères

Victoriaville

Westmount

Windsor

See also
Municipal elections in Canada
Electronic voting in Canada
2006 Quebec municipal elections
2005 Quebec municipal elections

Sources
 November 1, 2009 municipal elections - The Chief Electoral Officer has begun his training tour intended for the stakeholders in municipal elections
 List of candidates

References

 
2009
November 2009 events in Canada